Knowledge is a detailed familiarity with, or understanding of, a person, thing or situation.

Knowledge may also refer to:

Arts, entertainment, and media

Music

Works
 Know (album), a 2018 album by Jason Mraz
 "Knowledge" (song), by ska punk band Operation Ivy
 The Knowledge (album), by British rock group Squeeze
 "Know" (Mary J. Blige song)
 "Known" (song), a 2017 song by Tauren Wells

Artists
 Knowledge (band), a Jamaican reggae group
 Knxwledge, an American music producer
 Knowledge, a ska punk band fronted by Nick Traina
 Knowledge, an English rapper (see British hip hop)

Periodicals
 Knowledge (magazine), a British science magazine from 1881 to 1918
 Knowledge (partwork), a British weekly educational magazine from 1961 to 1966
 BBC Knowledge (magazine), a British magazine founded in 2008

Television
 BBC Knowledge, a British television channel
 Knowledge Channel, an educational television channel in the Philippines
 Knowledge Network, an educational television channel in British Columbia
 Knowledge TV, a defunct American Cable Network

Books
 Knowledge encyclopædia, a British magazine for children which was assembled in binders into an encyclopedia
 The Knowledge: How to Rebuild Our World from Scratch, a non-fiction book by Lewis Dartnell

Films
 The Knowledge (film), a 1979 film

Visual art
 The Knowledge (mural), a 2010 mural

Other uses
 Knowledge, a concept in English law, see knowingly
 The Knowledge, geographical training for London taxi drivers
 Known (software), an open source publishing tool
 Knowledge (philosophy)

See also
The Know (disambiguation)
Dr. Know (disambiguation)
Do You Know (disambiguation)
I Know (disambiguation)
 KNOW-FM, a Minnesota Public Radio station
 Knower (disambiguation)
Who Knows (disambiguation)